The Global Multimedia Protocols Group (GMPG) was founded in March 2003 by Tantek Çelik, Eric A. Meyer, and Matt Mullenweg.  The group has developed methods to represent human relationships using XHTML called XHTML Friends Network (XFN) and XHTML Meta Data Profiles (XMDP), for use in weblogs.

It is an informal organization that engages in experiments in metamemetics.

It was first mentioned in 1992 by author Neal Stephenson in his novel Snow Crash.

GMPG was founded to develop the initial principles for XFN, the XHTML Friends Network as an attempt for the creation of a simple way to express human relationships on the Web within HTML (machine-readable).

, an analysis of the network of pages collected by Common Crawl found that the web host gmpg.org had the highest PageRank and third highest in-degree of all the hosts in the network.

XFN - XHTML Friends Network
XFN provides a list of non-standard attribute values for the HTML attribute "rel", which is used within the "A" element for hyperlinks.

See also 
 Microformats

References

External links
GMPG.org official website
GMPG Principles

Internet-related organizations
Organizations established in 2003
2003 establishments in the United States